Nalu (nalɛ, nul; also spelled Nalou) is an Atlantic language of Guinea and Guinea-Bissau, spoken by the Nalu people, a West African people who settled the region before the arrival of the Mandinka in the 14th or 15th centuries. It is spoken predominantly by adults. It is estimated to be spoken by a range of 10,000 to 25,000 people, whereas Wilson (2007) reports that there are around 12,000 speakers. It is considered an endangered language due to its dwindling population of speakers.

Classification 
Contrary to prior classifications, Güldemann (2018) classifies Nalu as unclassified within Niger-Congo. It also does not form a subgroup with the Rio Nunez languages.

Nalu is traditionally classified as Niger-Congo, Atlantic-Congo, Mbulugish-Nalu.

History 
The Nalu people who speak Nalu have been described as settling in West Africa before the Mandinka people. This would place them as existing in West Africa between the 14th and 15th centuries. Wilson (2007) reports that the Nalu people had originally come from Guinea-Bissau.

Today, the Nalu speakers are shifting toward the Susu language which is gaining more popularity in Guinea. It has a predominantly adult-speaking population. The next generation is being passed on the language, however, in a few remote villages around Katoufoura.

Geographic distribution 
Nalu is spoken predominantly on the littorals, or shore regions, of Guinea and Guinea-Bissau. Most Nalu speakers in Guinea live north of the Nuñez River on the Tristão islands, in the sub-prefecture of Kanfarandé which is the prefecture of Boké. In Guinea-Bissau, most speakers of Nalu live in the Cacine estuary in the Tombali region.

Vocabulary 

Nalu underwent a sound change in its language. Sound change generally occurs due to what sounds require less effort for the speaker. These sound changes are usually limited to each dialect in a language and examples of the Nalu language sound changes are in the section below. Nalu has six dialects. Three are spoken in Guinea-Conakry and three are spoken in Guinée-Bissau. However, the relationship between the dialects is unknown.

Examples 
Nouns 

Verbs

Sound Changes Over Time

References

External links 
 Glottolog
 Joshua Project
 ELAR archive of Nalu Language

Senegambian languages
Languages of Guinea
Languages of Guinea-Bissau